Heker is a surname. Notable people with the surname include:

Harald Heker (born 1958), German chief executive
Liliana Heker (born 1943), Argentine writer

See also
Eker (surname)
Hecker (surname)